Palpada megafemur is a species of flower flies. It is named after its particularly large metafemur. It is found in Brazil.

Description
The following description is of a male specimen. Its face is black except for a brownish tubercle. Its thorax is black except for the yellow scutellum; the postpronotum is yellowish brown; the mesonotum is yellow pilose; the scutellum is yellow except narrowly black on the base; pleuron is gray pollinose; the calypter, plumula and haltere are orange.

Its coxae and trochanters are black; its femora are black except becoming brownish to orange on the apical 1/4, and shiny except for the mesofemur, which is sparsely gray on its apical 2/3; tibiae are orange; tarsi are orange. Its metafemur is greatly enlarged, its ventral margin sinuate, with a large ventral tubercle on the basoposterior 1/3.

The wings are light brown and microtrichose except for some bare portions.

The abdomen's 1st tergum is black; 2nd tergum yellow except for small basomedial triangular maculae; 3rd tergum is yellow, with indistinct dark medial vitta; 4th tergum is brownish black and light yellowish brown laterally. Its 1st sternum is black; 2nd and 3rd sterna are yellow; 4th sternum is brownish black except for its yellow apical margin. Male genitalia are orangish brown.

References

External links

ADW entry

Diptera of South America
Eristalinae
Insects described in 1999
Taxa named by F. Christian Thompson